Gianna Angelopoulos-Daskalaki (born Ioanna Daskalaki, December 12, 1955) is a Greek businesswoman and Ambassador-at-Large for the Hellenic Republic.  She is best known for being the leader of the bidding and organizing committees for the 2004 Summer Olympics in Athens. In July 2019, she was appointed by Prime Minister Kyriakos Mitsotakis, to lead Greece 2021, a year-long initiative to both commemorate the 200th anniversary of the Greek Revolution and to introduce to the world a new Greece of effort and optimism. 

She was named one of the 50 most powerful women by Forbes magazine and is the author of the New York Times Bestseller My Greek Drama.

Early life
Ioanna Daskalaki was born to a middle-class family in Heraklion, Crete. Daskalaki studied law in the Aristotle University of Thessaloniki.

Personal life
In 1990, she married the Greek shipping and steel magnate Theodore Angelopoulos, and has since been involved in several aspects of Angelopoulos' business interests, mainly in shipping. 

She is the mother of three children, Panagiotis, Dimitris, and Carolina Angelopoulos, and the grandmother of three granddaughters.

Political career
In the late 1980s, she became actively involved in politics in Athens. In 1986, she was elected to the Athens Municipal Council. In 1989, she was elected to the Greek Parliament, and won reelection the following year.

In 1998, she was appointed Ambassador at Large by the Greek government. She was paid for this appointment and donates the sums to several Greek charities each year.

In 2004 she was appointed Commander of the Order of Honour of the Hellenic Republic and in 2008, she was appointed Chevalier of the French Republic's National Order of the Legion of Honor.

Involvement in the 2004 Summer Olympic Games

Disappointed over losing the bid for the centenary celebration of the revival of the Olympic Games in 1996, Greek officials decided to bid for the 2004 Summer bidding committee, making her the first female president of any Olympic organizing committee, and succeeded in bringing the games to Athens. She was however excluded from the initial organization committee that would prepare for the games.

When the International Olympic Committee questioned Greece's commitment to the games and its ability to complete all preparations prior to the opening ceremony, Angelopoulos-Daskalaki was asked to return and was named president of the Olympic Organizing Committee in May 2000. She was the first woman to hold this position. Under her watch, competition facilities were completed and security issues were taken care of. International Olympic Committee presidents Juan Antonio Samaranch and Jacques Rogge both specifically credit Gianna Angelopoulos-Daskalaki for the success of the games. In his speech at the Closing Ceremony, Rogge said, "These Games were unforgettable, dream Games."

After the 2004 Olympic Games, Angelopoulos-Daskalaki bought the Eleftheros Typos newspaper ("Free Press”); the daily paper eventually was wound up, with its staff receiving on top of their severance pay the proceeds from the sale of the paper’s title.

Involvement In Greece 2021

Greece 2021 is a multidimensional initiative that will occur at the time of the 200th Anniversary of the Greek Revolution. While honoring Greece's past, Greece 2021 will primarily celebrate the skill and resilience of the Greek people and demonstrate its confidence in the future. Specific emphasis on entrepreneurship, science and innovation, will highlight the opportunities found in the modern Greece.

In 2019, the Greek Government appointed Mrs Angelopoulos as President of the "Greece 2021" National Committee.

Post-political career
In 1994, she was appointed Vice-Chairman of the Dean’s Council of Harvard University’s John F. Kennedy School of Government, where she continues to serve today.

In 1995, Angelopoulos-Daskalaki co-chaired, along with Kennedy School Professor Graham Allison, a Harvard Leadership Symposium titled The Greek Paradox: Promise vs. Performance, which addressed the gap between Greece’s potential and its performance in the realms of politics, economic growth, and regional leadership. Harvard published a book that followed the symposium with the same title. Angelopoulos-Daskalaki is the author of the book’s preface.

In 2008, Harvard University, in collaboration with the Kennedy School of Government Chan School of Public Health, established the Angelopoulos Chair for Public Health and International Development.

In 2012, she created the Harvard Kennedy School-based Angelopoulos Global Public Leaders Fellowship program as a part of a Commitment to Action for the Clinton Global Initiative. The program was announced by Ambassador Angelopoulos, with Dean Ellwood and former U.S. President Bill Clinton at the Clinton Global Initiative annual meeting in 2011. The program provides opportunities for high-profile leaders who are transitioning out of public office or other leadership positions to spend time in residence at Harvard for teaching, learning and research. 

In 2013, Angelopoulos-Daskalaki established the Angelopoulos Clinton Global Initiative University (CGIU) Fellowship program to recruit, select and sponsor Greek students with implementable entrepreneurial ideas. She has since sponsored over 75 students. In 2016, she announced the evolution of the CGIU program into the Angelopoulos 100, a vehicle to sustain and support the alumni of the program and continue to empower Greek entrepreneurs.

In February of 2019, Gianna Angelopoulos established an innovative program at Cambridge University that further reflects her commitment to education, entrepreneurship and economic growth. The Gianna Angelopoulos Programme for Science, Technology and Innovation will be an internationally unique ecosystem of training, research and entrepreneurial activity. The Programme will support PhD students and four academic positions based at the University’s Cavendish Laboratory in the fields of energy materials and devices and computational multiphysics.

Authored Books
She is the author of My Greek Drama: Life, Love, and One Woman's Olympic Effort to Bring Glory to Her Country. The book debuted at #18 on the New York Times Nonfiction Bestseller list for the June 2, 2013 print edition, and entered the top 10 at #7 in the June 9, 2013 print edition of the paper. The book was also a Wall Street Journal and USA Today bestseller.

TV Interviews
MSNBC 5/6/13: Greece Is In a 'Bad Marriage With the European Union'

References

1955 births
Greek women in business
Living people
Businesspeople from Heraklion
Presidents of the Organising Committees for the Olympic Games
Recipients of the Olympic Order
Recipients of the Paralympic Order